Henry Priestley may refer to:
 Henry Priestley (biochemist)
 Henry Priestley (mathematician)